"You're Gonna Get Hurt" is a song by New Zealand musician, Jenny Morris. It was released in September 1986 the lead single from her debut studio album, Body and Soul (1987). Also released at the same time was a 12" extended version, also featuring "Cool" as the B side, along with the 7" single version.

At the ARIA Music Awards of 1987, the song won ARIA Award for Best Female Artist.

Track listings
 7"  (WEA – 0-258635)
 "You're Gonna Get Hurt" – 3:39
 "Cool" – 4:10

Charts

References

1986 songs
1986 singles
Jenny Morris (musician) songs
Songs written by Andrew Farriss
ARIA Award-winning songs